Corson Inlet is a narrow strait on the southern coast of New Jersey in the United States.

Corson Inlet leads from the Atlantic Ocean through barrier islands off the northeast coast of Cape May County, New Jersey. The Inlet separates Ocean City, New Jersey from Strathmere, New Jersey.

The United States Navy seaplane tender USS Corson, in commission from 1944 to 1946 and 1951 to 1956, was named for Corson Inlet.

Corson's Inlet State Park borders the strait.

The inlet and adjacent dunes were a favorite place for the amblings of American poet, A.R. Ammons resulting in one of his best known poems, "Corsons Inlet".

The passing of automobiles to Corson's inlet has naturally left giant, mogul-like bumps in the road, oddly evenly spaced, all reaching the same height and depth (approx. 3 feet).

Geography
Corson Inlet separates Pecks Beach from Ludlam Island in Cape May County.

It was described in 1834 as,

Corson Inlet was described in 1878, viz.,

History
Corson Inlet appears as Bottle Inlet on a map circa 1700; and as "Coston's Inlet" on a map published in 1749 by Lewis Evans.

Notes

References
Merriam Webster's Geographical Dictionary, Third Edition. Springfield, Massachusetts: Merriam-Webster, Incorporated, 1997. .
 (See ship namesake paragraph.)
 Lehman, D.(Ed.) (2006). A.R. Ammons: Selected Poems. American Poets Project, pp. 18–22. New York: Library of America.

Inlets of New Jersey
Straits of New Jersey
Bodies of water of Cape May County, New Jersey